Paul Hale is an English organist and Organist Emeritus of Southwell Minster, Nottinghamshire.
 
He was previously Assistant Organist of Rochester Cathedral and Organist of Tonbridge School. He studied at New College, Oxford where he was Organ Scholar. He studied with Sir David Lumsden and Professor Nicholas Danby, gaining an MA in Music.

Hale is Conductor of the Nottingham Bach Choir, an Examiner for the Royal College of Organists. He is also Chairman of the RSCM Southwell & Nottinghamshire Area, and a Trustee of the Percy Whitlock Trust and of the Nottingham Albert Hall Binns Organ Trust.

He is Organ Adviser and Consultant to the dioceses of Lincoln and Southwell & Nottingham. He designed and led the restoration of the organ at Solihull School; and has designed organs for Southwell, Rochester and Lincoln Cathedrals; Glasgow University, Bridlington Priory,  Glenalmond, Leicester’s De Montfort Hall and designed and led the restoration of many others.

He has appeared at both the Three Choirs Festival and the St Albans International Organ Festival. As well as this, he was also author of over twenty articles for the second edition of The New Grove Dictionary of Music and Musicians.

He has toured internationally. In 2005 he represented Britain in the Brussels Organ Festival. Recently he has toured Norway, America and was invited to play at St Sulpice in Paris.

He was President of the Cathedral Organists Association 1999–2001 and as of 2010 was Chairman of the annual Diocesan Organ Advisers’ Conference and President of the Nottingham & District Society of Organists.

He has recorded with the Southwell Minster Choir as well as his own organ performances.

In June 2017, he was awarded the Cranmer Award for Worship by the Archbishop of Canterbury "for his distinguished service as Rector Chori and Cathedral Organist at Southwell Minster and as one of the UK's foremost organ consultants".

Professional achievements

FRCO (Fellow of the Royal College of Organists)
ARCM (Associate of the Royal College of Music)
PGCE (Post-Graduate Certificate in Education)
FRSA (Fellow of the Royal Society of Arts)
Honorary FGCM (Fellow of the Guild of Church Musicians)
FRSCM (Fellow of the Royal School of Church Music)
an Accredited Member of the Association of Independent Organ Advisers.

Critique
The Nottingham Post said "under his direction the score showed a fine sense of pace and impressive climaxes" as he led the Nottingham Bach Choir & Orchestra in 2009  and earlier that year it had suggested that Hale should be recognized as a musician "capable of outstanding feats of stamina" for directing the Bach Society's St John Passion and the Harmonic's Brahms' German Requiem in consecutive weeks.
His 2009 organ recital at Liverpool was described as an "exacting champion of subtlety – the difference that but one stop can make.". More recently his direction of Bach's Christmas Oratorio (1734) with the Nottingham Bach Choir  was described as being a "thoughtful, spirited performance, truly fine and memorable."

He is highly regarded as a choral trainer and conductor. He was recently praised for leading the Nottingham Bach Choir of Elgar's the Kingdom to a performance "which resulted in a confident and emotive reading of the score."

References

Living people
Alumni of New College, Oxford
Cathedral organists
English organists
British male organists
21st-century organists
21st-century British male musicians
Year of birth missing (living people)
Organ Scholars of New College, Oxford
Male classical organists